1-O,6-O-Digalloyl-β-D-glucose is a gallotannin. It can be found in some oak species.

References 

Gallotannins